Cedric Thorpe Davie OBE FRSE FRAM  RSA LLD (30 May 1913 – 18 January 1983) was a musician and composer, specialising in film scores, most notably The Green Man in 1956. A high proportion of his film and documentary work and compositional work has a Scottish theme.

Life
He was born in Lewisham in south London, the son of Thorpe Davie, a music teacher and choir master. The family moved to Glasgow early in his life and he attended the High School of Glasgow.

He studied at the Scottish National Academy of Music in Glasgow and the Royal Academy of Music in London. In London he was instructed in piano by Egon Petri and Harold Craxton, and horn by Aubrey Brain. He was instructed in composition by Ralph Vaughan Williams and Dr R. O. Morris. In 1935 he travelled to both Helsinki and Budapest, for further training under Yrjo Kilpinen and Zoltán Kodály. He returned to Glasgow in 1936 and began lecturing in music.
Early works included creation of operas such as Gammer Gurton's Needle.

In the Second World War he served in the National Fire Service covering the Glasgow docklands (an area of intense bombing). After the war he moved to St Andrews University as Master of Music, being raised to full Professor of Music in 1973.

He was involved in the newly created Edinburgh Festival in the 1950s, and oversaw production of important new Scottish musical works such as Ane Satyre of the Thrie Estaites. He was fond of putting Scottish literary works to music, including: Sunset Song, Cloud Howe, The Beggar's Benison, A Drunk Man Looks at the Thistle, and Ramsay's The Gentle Shepherd. He also wrote the music for the Edinburgh Gateway Company's production of Robert Kemp's musical Marigold in 1955.

In 1955 he was made an Officer of the Order of the British Empire (OBE). In 1978, he was elected a Fellow of the Royal Society of Edinburgh. His proposers were Sir Thomas Malcolm Knox, J. Steven Watson, Sir Norman Graham, Norman Gash, GWS Barrow and Anthony Elliot Ritchie.

He lived in St John's Town of Dalry, Kirkcudbrightshire and died there on 18 January 1983.

A substantial collection of his manuscripts and scores is held by the University of St Andrews.

Family
In 1937, he married Margaret Russell Brown.  She died on 1 October 1974. They had two sons.
  Anthony John Thorpe Davie (17 November 1939 – 8 January 2003)
 Stephen William Thorpe Davie (born 8 April 1945)

Recognition
In 2013, St Andrews University held a special event to mark the centenary of Davie's birth.

Film scores by Davie
Scotland Speaks (1940) documentary
This Modern Age (1946)
The Brothers (1947)
 Snowbound (1948)
The Future of Scotland (1948) documentary
The Bad Lord Byron (1949)
The Adventurers (1951)
You're Only Young Twice (1952)
Highland Laddie (1952) documentary
Rob Roy, the Highland Rogue (1953) a Disney film usually now simply called Rob Roy
The Miner's Widow (1954) documentary
The Dark Avenger (1955)
Jacqueline (1956)
The Land of Robert Burns (1956) documentary
The Green Man (1956)
The Kid from Canada (1957)
The Enchanted Island (1957)
Wales (1957) documentary
Scotland (1957) documentary
Rockets Galore! (1958)
The Bridal Path (1959)
A Terrible Beauty (1960)
Kidnapped (1960)
Disneyland (1963)

Publications
 Music Structure and Design (1966)
 The Oxford Scottish Song Book (1969) joint editor
 Scotland's Music (1980)

References

External links
 

1913 births
1983 deaths
20th-century classical composers
British film score composers
Academics of the University of St Andrews
Fellows of the Royal Society of Edinburgh
20th-century conductors (music)
20th-century English composers
20th-century classical pianists
Composers for piano
English classical composers
English classical pianists
Male classical pianists
English opera composers
Male opera composers
English male classical composers
People from Lewisham
Officers of the Order of the British Empire
People educated at the High School of Glasgow
British male pianists
British male film score composers
20th-century British male musicians